Yan-Kay Crystal Lowe (born Yan-Kay Lo; January 20, 1981) is a Canadian actress. She is known for her scream queen roles in horror films such as Children of the Corn: Revelation (2001), Final Destination 3 (2006), Black Christmas (2006), and Wrong Turn 2: Dead End (2007). She played Rita Haywith in Hallmark Channel's television and television film series Signed, Sealed, Delivered (2013–2021).

Early life
Lowe was born Yan-Kay Lo (Chinese: 羅艷琪, Yale: Lòh Yihm Kèih) in Vancouver, British Columbia to a Scottish mother and Chinese father  from Hong Kong. When she was young her father moved back to Hong Kong with his family, where they lived for several years. In an interview in 2016, Lowe said that she had wanted to be an actress since the age of five.

Career
Lowe started her career as a model. Her first acting role was at age 15 as Nya on an episode of Stargate SG-1. Lowe went on to guest star in several popular television shows like Masters of Horror, Psych, Supernatural, Stargate: Atlantis, The L Word, plus many more.

Lowe's first film role came in 2000 when she was cast in the film Get Carter. Soon after she was cast as Tiffany in the horror film Children of the Corn: Revelation. In 2006, Lowe was cast as Ashlyn Halperin in Final Destination 3. Her next role was as Lauren in the remake of Black Christmas. Lowe later went on to star as Elena in Wrong Turn 2: Dead End.

Lowe went on to do cameo roles in the films Fantastic Four: Rise of the Silver Surfer and Good Luck Chuck. In 2008 she was reunited with her Final Destination 3 co-stars Sam Easton and Amanda Crew in the film That One Night. Also in 2008, Lowe was cast in supporting roles for the films Yeti: Curse of the Snow Demon, Poison Ivy: The Secret Society and Center Stage: Turn It Up.

In 2010, Lowe appeared as Zoe in the film Hot Tub Time Machine, as Vala in the ninth season of the CW show Smallville and as Nina in Sheldon Wilson's horror/thriller film Killer Mountain. In mid-2011, Lowe was cast as Tina in A Little Bit Zombie and as Piper/Peaches in the TV movie To the Mat. In early 2012, she was cast as Toby Nance, one of the lead characters in the new series Primeval: New World.

In 2014, Lowe was cast as Rita Haywith in the Hallmark series Signed, Sealed, Delivered, which aired for one season in 2014 before becoming successive television films. In 2015, she took a role behind the camera, directing the locally produced short film Becoming Sophie which was featured at Cannes Short Film Library and L.A. Women's Film Festival.

In 2017, Lowe played Sarah Albans, the mother of Julian, the main antagonist in the film version of Wonder, based on the 2012 novel.

Personal life
On August 8, 2009, Lowe married Miko Tomasevich at Vancouver's historic Hycroft Manor. She and her husband own Hyde Restaurant in Vancouver, British Columbia.

Lowe is fluent in Cantonese.

Filmography

Film

Television

Awards and nominations

Notes

References

External links

 

1981 births
Living people
Actresses from Vancouver
Canadian people of Scottish descent
Canadian child actresses
Canadian film actresses
Canadian television actresses
Canadian actresses of Chinese descent
Canadian people of Hong Kong descent
Female models from British Columbia